The Potros de Tijuana were a baseball club that played in the Mexican Pacific League and later in the Mexican League. The Potros were based in Tijuana, Baja California, and played their home games at Estadio Nacional de Tijuana (Tijuana National Stadium) from 2005 through 2008 before being relocated by the League.

Early history
An earlier incarnation of the Potros (or Colts) de Tijuana played in the short-lived Sunset League from 1949–1950 (originally as the Salinas Colts), and moved to the Southwest International League from 1951–1952. After three years of absence, they became a member of the Arizona–Mexico League during the 1956 season, before joining the Mexican League from 2005–2008. Another Potros de Tijuana club played in the Mexican Pacific League, taking championship titles in the 1987–1988 and 1990–1991 seasons to advance to the Caribbean Series in both times.

Mexican League
The franchise actually was a descendant of the Triple-A Toros de Tijuana before the Mexican League reportedly to have stripped the Toros owner of his franchise and gave it to new owners, who renamed the team as the Potros de Tijuana.

The new Toros ownership kept the same team name, logo, uniforms and history, as a result of the alleged political wrangling that went on in that league.

In 2009, the Potros moved to Reynosa, Tamaulipas and were renamed the Broncos de Reynosa.

Golden Baseball League

On December 15, 2008, the Golden Baseball League signed a letter of intent to bring an expansion franchise to Tijuana after the 2008 Mexican League franchise was disbanded and relocated to Reynosa, Tamaulipas.

On January 13, 2009, the league officially welcomed the Potros.  They were to join fellow expansion teams, the Tucson Toros and Victoria Seals.

On May 7, 2009, the GBL announced the postponement of the Potros' inaugural season until 2010 due to Mexico's swine flu outbreak and the subsequent health risk and precautionary measures that resulted from it.

Before the season was cancelled, the 2009 Potros had three Mexican Baseball Hall of Fame members on the coaching staff including Manager Mario Mendoza, Pitching Coach José Peña, and Bench Coach Jorge Fitch.

The Tijuana Potros changed their name to the Tijuana Cimarrones and joined the Golden Baseball League for one season in 2010.

Famous players
 Luis Gonzalez (1990–1991)

See also
 Toros de Tijuana (Mexican League team)
 Tijuana Cimarrones (Golden Baseball League team)

References

External links
 Potros de Tijuana Official website (Spanish)
 Mexican League Official website

Defunct baseball teams in Mexico
Defunct minor league baseball teams
Baseball teams in Tijuana
Baseball teams established in 2005
2005 establishments in Mexico
2008 disestablishments in Mexico
Baseball teams disestablished in 2008